The General Electric T64 is a free-turbine turboshaft engine that was originally developed for use on helicopters, but which was later used on fixed-wing aircraft as well. General Electric introduced the engine in 1964. The original engine design included technical innovations such as corrosion resistant and high-temperature coatings. The engine features a high overall pressure ratio, yielding a low specific fuel consumption for its time. Although the compressor is all-axial, like the earlier General Electric T58, the power turbine shaft is coaxial with the HP shaft and delivers power to the front of the engine, not rearwards. Fourteen compressor stages are required to deliver the required overall pressure ratio. Compressor handling is facilitated by 4 rows of variable stators. Unlike the T58, the power turbine has 2 stages.

The engine was designed to accommodate different gearboxes or shaft drives, for helicopter or turboprop fixed-wing applications. The engine could be operated continuously at angles between 100 degrees upward and 45 degrees downward for STOL or helicopter applications.

Variants

''Data from: Vectorsite;Sikorsky Giant Helicopters

Applications

Specifications (T64-GE-100)

See also

Notes

References

External links

 GE Aviation T64 page
 GE Aviation Receives AHS Supplier Excellence Award (for T64 team) 

T64
1960s turboshaft engines
1960s turboprop engines